Cirroctopus is a genus of four species of octopuses within the monotypic family Cirroctopodidae. Members of this genus have larger fins than other cirrate octopuses, and tend to be more muscular. They are found in the southern hemisphere, where they live at depths of over 300m.

References

Octopuses
Taxa named by Adolf Naef